= Vanniappar Temple =

Vanniappar temple is located in Azwarkuruchi Village in Tirunelveli District, India. This temple is nearly 1000 years old. Since there has not been any maintenance it is in a very dilapidated condition, however, due to the effort of some devotees in the village now the temple is going undergoing a slow renovation.
